Michael Ray Martin (born September 29, 1949, in Texarkana, Arkansas) is an American country music artist, known professionally as Martin Delray. He worked as a songwriter in the 1980s, with his writing credits including "Old Fashioned Love" by The Kendalls. Delray's first single release was "Temptation" in 1985 on the Compleat label, credited to Mike Martin.

He recorded two albums on the Atlantic Records label: 1991's Get Rhythm and 1992's What Kind of Man. In addition, he charted five singles on the Billboard Hot Country Singles & Tracks charts. Delray's highest-charting single was a cover version of Johnny Cash's "Get Rhythm," which Delray took to #27 on the country charts. Cash sang guest vocals on Delray's version and was featured in its music video.

He also sang the National Anthem at WCW Fall Brawl 1994.

Discography

Albums

Singles

Music videos

References

1949 births
American country singer-songwriters
Singer-songwriters from Arkansas
Living people
Atlantic Records artists
Country musicians from Arkansas